Anti-scratch coating is a type of protective coating or film applied to an object's surface for mitigation against scratches. Scratches are small surface-level cuts left on a surface following interaction with a sharper object. Anti-scratch coatings provide scratch resistances by containing tiny microscopic materials with scratch-resistant properties. Scratch resistance materials come in the form of additives, filters, and binders. Besides materials, scratch resistances is impacted by coating formation techniques. Scratch resistance is measured using the Scratch-hardness test. Commercially, anti-scratch coatings are used in the automotive, optical, photographic, and electronics industries, where resale and/or functionality is impaired by scratches. Anti-scratch coatings are of growing importance as traditional scratch resistance materials like metals and glass are replaced with low-scratch resistant plastics.

Applications 
Automotive, Optical, and Electronics are major sectors of anti-scratch coatings.

Automotive 
Anti-scratch coatings in the automotive industry maintain a car's appearance and prevent damage of a car's anti-corrosion layer. The anti-corrosion layer protects car metals from environmental harm. Automotive anti-scratch coatings are becoming stronger (from 10 newtons to 15 newtons of protection) to counter scratch resistance lost due to the industry shift from steel to lightweight, but low-scratch resistant plastics and aluminium. Currently, scratch-formation is decreased with a primer and clear coat. The primer is made of polyolefin-resin, while the clear coat contains the additives siloxane and erucamide.

Optical 
Scratch-resistant coatings are added to glasses due to scratches' extreme ability to impact a wearer's vision. Even when optical glasses are made of high scratch-resistances glass, polycarbonate, or CR-39, coatings are still used. Optical coatings include diamond-like carbon (DLC) and anti-reflective-scratch hybrid coatings. Diamond-like Carbon is a coating that shares diamonds' extreme scratch resistance. Anti-reflective Scratch hybrid coatings contain scratch-resistant additives with anti-reflective coating materials.

Electronics 
In the electronics industry, scratches-resistances coatings are applied to electronic screens to prevent primary fingernails scratches. Screens are made of either polycarbonate (the highest Scratch-resistant plastic) or higher-end glass. Electronics Industry Anti-Scratch coatings often contain the anti-scratch additives siloxane, and the anti-Scratch filters TiO2 (titanium dioxide) and SiO2 (silicon dioxide). The additives and Filters are combined with a Fluorocarbons resin. Fluorocarbon resin is an oleophobic material. Oleophobic materials are materials that repeal oils caused by fingerprints.

Other uses 
Anti-scratch coatings are often used on plastic products wherever optical clarity, weathering, and chemical resistance are required.  Examples include optical discs, displays, injection-molded parts, gauges and other instruments, mirrors, signs, eye safety/protective goggles, and cosmetic packaging.  These coatings are usually water-based or solvent-based.

Anti-scratch coating compositions 
Scratch-resistant materials are present in anti-Starch coating either as binders, additives, and/or filters. Binder, additives, filters make up Anti-Scratch coating's Thin-film, a thin nano-meter to micro-meter layer applied to a substrate (an object's surface).

Binders 
In anti-scratch coatings, binders (coatings' glue-like cohesive structure) provide scratch resistance or/and provide structure for scratch resistant 
additives and filters.

Binders that offer scratch resistances and structure include:

Ceramic-(Inorganic-non metal-based) binders
 Polysilazanes
 Diamond-like Carbon
 Resin (organic polymer-based) binders
 epoxy
 polycarbonate
 polyethylene

Fillers 
Scratch-resistant coatings use special Scratch-resistant fillers. Fillers are particles that enhance specific functional properties of coatings with/or with binders. Common Scratch-resistant fillers include:

- titanium dioxide(TiO2)

-zirconium dioxide(ZrO2)

-Aluminum oxide hydroxide(AlOOH)

-Silicon monoxide(SiO)

Additives 
Anti-scratch coatings use additives with specific Scratch-resistant properties. Additives are particles dispersed in a thin film in quantities of less than one percent.

Additives that decrease scratch visibility include:

 Siloxane
 Eruamides (A type of fatty acid used in coatings due to fatty acid amide's scratch-resistant properties)

Additives that lower friction, an important part of Scratch resistance, include:

MoS2,
graphite.
oleic acid amide

Additives that control for micro-cracking, a micro-sized step in Scratch formation, include:

ZnO (Zinc oxide)
BaO (Barium oxide)
PbO (lead dioxide)

Theory 
Anti-scratch coatings change the substrate's Tribological (Properties resulting from surface-environment interaction) and Mechanical (a material's physical properties) properties. Changed Tribological and Mechanical properties impact Scratch's deformation Mechanisms (microscopic effects of deforming a material), Scratch visibility, friction, and other additional considerations.

Impact on deformation Mechanisms 
Scratch-resistant coatings lessen the impacts of scratches three primary deformation mechanisms: Ironing, micro-cracking, and plowing.

Plowing 
The dislocation of atoms into weaker Atomic planes due to Plowing's plastic deformations.
Plowing is when an indenture breaks a material's surface and leaves scratch marks. Anti-Scratch coatings contain filter-based materials with high ductility (ability to withstand plastic deformations) to limit plowing. Plastic deformations occur when the atomic bonds holding atomic planes break, causing the planes to dislocate into weaker positions. Control for plowing is important as every additional plowing event leaves a scratch and greater risk for internal damage, which will decrease products lifespan.

Micro cracking 
Micro-cracking is micro-sized cracks that form on brittle surfaces due to the jerking indentor movement known as stick-slip. Anti-scratch coatings control for Micro-cracking by containing either filters, binders, or additives with high tensile strength. Recently, anti-scratch research is focusing on nano-cracking, the nanotribical version of microcracking by creating nano-specific additives.

Ironing 
Anti-scratch coatings control scratch ironing by either prolonging or preventing elastic deformations. Elastic deformations are non-permanent stretching of atomic bonds occurring before plastic deformation.

Anti-scratch coatings control elastic deformations, which causes a short-term grooving effect, by decreasing elasticity and increasing ductility. Decreasing elasticity, however, must be balanced since low elasticity causes micro-cracking.

Scratch resistance can also be increased by prolonging the ironing period with yield point materials. Yield point is the point a materials change from elastic to plastic deformations. Higher yield point materials decrease permeant plowing, by increasing non-permeant ironing.

Friction 
Scratch resistance coatings contain low friction, the sliding resistance force, surfaces. Low friction surfaces are smooth. Smooth surfaces are important since rougher surfaces are scratches prone: as shown by the Archard Wear Equation.

Archard equation:

W: volume of Wear created during a scratch event.

S: The distance during which both objects were in contact with each other.

N: normal force or amount of pressure applied by the indenting object.

H: Hardness of the material, measured by a given coefficient.

K: The Archard Wear dimensionless constant value of 1x108.

Considerations for plastics 
Scratch-resistant coatings applied to substrates control for Plastic low-Scratch-Hardness by being coated with non-plastic materials. Plastics contain low-Scratch-Hardness due to plastic's high viscoelasticity (highly viscous and elastic deformations) and low crystallinity (High ordered Structure).

Decreasing scratch visibility

Surface topology map showing waviness and lay
Scratch visibility is impacted by surface grooving. Grooving surrounding a scratch site changes the angle of reflection (direction of light causing waves). When the angle of reflection is greater than 3 percent, scratch's become visible. Anti-scratch coatings control scratch visibility by having a low grooving surface. Besides friction, low grooving surfaces depend on the topology (surface) factors of surface texture (lay) and spacing of irregularities (waviness). Topology is controlled by extreme precision during the coating formation process.

Coating formation 
Main section coating formation

Coating formation is the process of coating-substrate adhesion(attachment). Anti-scratch coatings are generally applied via spray (hand or automated), dip, spin, roll or flow coating. Coating Formation uses "Precision factor" to affect topology-dependent Scratch properties. "Precision factors" include additive concentration, coating thickness, and Viscosity.

Most coating types can be cleaned with a non-ammonia based glass cleaner and a soft cloth.

Testing of Scratch Resistance 
ASTM International, American Society for Testing and Materials, set material testing standards for materials, including Anti-scratch coatings. Most scratch-resistant coatings fall under ASTM standard D7027 - 20 (See External Links). Standard scratch resistance tests involve scratching coatings with a diamond indentor.

See also 
 Anti-reflective coating
 coatings

References

External links 
 

Thin-film optics